Randolph Samuel Kinder (born April 4, 1975) is a former running back in the National Football League. He played with the Philadelphia Eagles and the Green Bay Packers 1997 NFL season. As such, he was a member of the NFC Championship team with the Packers.

He played at the collegiate level at the University of Notre Dame.

See also
List of Philadelphia Eagles players
List of Green Bay Packers players

References

1975 births
Living people
Players of American football from Washington, D.C.
American football running backs
Notre Dame Fighting Irish football players
Philadelphia Eagles players
Green Bay Packers players
Notre Dame Fighting Irish men's track and field athletes